Dianne Van Rensburg (born 3 April 1968) is a former professional tennis player from South Africa. Known as Dinky, she won one singles title and three doubles titles from 1986 to 1990. She reached a highest singles ranking of No. 26 in January 1991.

WTA Tour finals

Singles 2 (1–1)

Doubles 8 (3–5)

ITF Finals

Singles (3-2)

Doubles (2-3)

External links 
 
 

South African female tennis players
1968 births
Living people
White South African people